Pınarcık may refer to:

 Pınarcık, Çorum
 Pınarcık, Demirözü
 Pınarcık, Serik
 Pınarcık massacre